HMS Raven was a  of the Royal Navy, built by Samuda Brothers of Poplar, London, and launched on 18 May 1882. She served on the Australia Station and was converted to a diving tender in 1904. After being lent as a training ship in 1913 she was sold for breaking in 1925.

Design
The Banterer class was designed by Nathaniel Barnaby, the Admiralty Director of Naval Construction. They were of composite construction, meaning that the frame, keel and sternpost were of iron, while the hull was planked with timber. This had the advantage of allowing the vessels to be coppered, thus keeping marine growth under control, a problem that caused iron-hulled ships to be frequently docked. In appearance they were distinguishable from the preceding s (also a Barnaby design) by their vertical stems.

Propulsion
The initial cost of the machinery was £6,250.

Armament
Ships of the class were armed with two 6-inch 64-pounder muzzle-loading rifles (a conversion of the smoothbore 32-pounder 58 cwt gun) and two 4-inch 20-pounder breech loading guns. A pair of machine guns were also fitted.

Construction
Raven was ordered from Samuda Brothers in 1880 and launched from their Poplar yard on 18 May 1882. The cost of building the hull was £14,800, while fitting out was conducted by the naval dockyard at Sheerness. She was rigged with three masts, and photographs of sister ships show a square rig on the foremast only, making them barquentine-rigged vessels.

Service history
Raven commissioned at Sheerness for the first time on 25 April 1883 and commenced service on the Australia Station. She left the Australia Station in October 1890. On 26 June 1897 she was present at the Naval Review at Spithead in celebration of the Diamond Jubilee. She was converted to a diving tender in 1904 and was lent as a training ship in March 1913.

Fate
Raven was sold for breaking on 13 March 1925.

Citations

References
 Bastock, John (1988), Ships on the Australia Station, Child & Associates Publishing Pty Ltd; Frenchs Forest, Australia. 

1882 ships
Ships built in Poplar
Banterer-class gunboats